Peter Lakota (born 23 November 1937 in Javornik, Kranj) is a Slovenian former alpine skier who competed for Yugoslavia in the 1964 Winter Olympics.

External links
 sports-reference.com
 

1937 births
Living people
Slovenian male alpine skiers
Olympic alpine skiers of Yugoslavia
Alpine skiers at the 1964 Winter Olympics
People from the City Municipality of Kranj
20th-century Slovenian people